The 1940 Milan–San Remo was the 33rd edition of the Milan–San Remo cycle race and was held on 19 March 1940. The race started in Milan and finished in San Remo. The race was won by Gino Bartali of the  team.

General classification

References

Milan–San Remo
Milan–San Remo
Milan–San Remo
Milan–San Remo